Mar Yousef VII Ghanima (January 29, 1881 – July 8, 1958) was the patriarch of the Chaldean Catholic Church from 1947 until his death in 1958.

Life
Mar Yousef VII Ghanima was born on January 29, 1881, in Mossul and was ordained a priest on May 15, 1904. An ethnic Assyrian, in 1925 he was ordained Auxiliary Bishop of Babylon of the Chaldean. He was the Patriarch of the Chaldean Church from September 17, 1947, till his death on July 8, 1958. He replaced Patriarch Yousef VI Emmanuel II Thomas and was followed by Paul II Cheikho.

With help from Mar Yousef VII Ghanima, the Patriarchate transferred from Mosul to Baghdad.

He was buried in the cemetery of St. Joseph church in Baghdad.

References

 

1881 births
1958 deaths
People from Mosul
Chaldean Catholic Patriarchs of Babylon
Iraqi archbishops
Iraqi Eastern Catholics
19th-century Eastern Catholic archbishops